Mount Albert is a prominent  mountain located in the Coast Mountains of British Columbia, Canada. Its nearest higher peak is Mount Tinniswood,  to the north-northeast. The name was officially adopted on May 6, 1924 when approved by the Geographical Names Board of Canada. The first ascent was made in 1929 by Arthur Tinniswood Dalton and Percy Williams Easthope.


Climate

Based on the Köppen climate classification, Mount Albert is located in a marine west coast climate zone of western North America. Most weather fronts originate in the Pacific Ocean, and travel east toward the Coast Mountains where they are forced upward by the range (Orographic lift), causing them to drop their moisture in the form of rain or snowfall. As a result, the Coast Mountains experience high precipitation, especially during the winter months in the form of snowfall. Winter temperatures can drop below −20 °C with wind chill factors  below −30 °C.

See also

 Geography of British Columbia
 Geology of British Columbia

References

External links
 Weather: Mount Albert

Pacific Ranges
Two-thousanders of British Columbia
New Westminster Land District